The following is a list of Major League Baseball players, retired or active. As of the end of the 2011 season, there have been 934 players with a last name that begins with G who have been on a major league roster at some point.

G
Kason Gabbard
Gabe Gabler
John Gabler
Ken Gables
Len Gabrielson (1B)
Len Gabrielson (OF)
John Gaddy
Eddie Gaedel
Gary Gaetti
Fabian Gaffke
Phil Gagliano
Ralph Gagliano
Éric Gagné
Greg Gagne
Ed Gagnier
Eddie Gaillard
Del Gainer
Jay Gainer
Steve Gajkowski
Augie Galan
Andrés Galarraga
Armando Galarraga
Bob Galasso
Rich Gale
Denny Galehouse
John Gall
Al Gallagher
Bob Gallagher
Dave Gallagher
Ed Gallagher
Joe Gallagher
Sean Gallagher
Yovani Gallardo
Mike Gallego
Bert Gallia
Phil Gallivan
Mike Gallo
Chick Galloway
Balvino Gálvez
Jim Galvin
Lou Galvin
Pud Galvin β
Mat Gamel
Chick Gandil
Bob Ganley
Bill Gannon
Ron Gant
Jim Gantner
Oscar Gamble
Babe Ganzel
Charlie Ganzel
John Ganzel
Eddy Garabito
Joe Garagiola
Víctor Gárate
Bob Garbark
Mike Garbark
Gene Garber
Bárbaro Garbey
Rich Garcés
Anderson García
Carlos García
Chico García
Dámaso García
Danny Garcia (OF)
Danny Garcia (2B)
Freddy Garcia (IF)
Freddy Garcia (P)
Harvey García
Jaime García
Jesse Garcia
José García
Karim García
Kiko Garcia
Leo Garcia
Luis García
Miguel García
Mike Garcia (AL P)
Mike Garcia (NL P)
Pedro García
Ramón García
Reynaldo Garcia
Rosman García
Nomar Garciaparra
Danny Gardella
Ron Gardenhire
Bill Garfield
Mike Gardiner
Alex Gardner
Billy Gardner
Brett Gardner
Gid Gardner
Glenn Gardner
Jeff Gardner
Larry Gardner
Lee Gardner
Mark Gardner
Wes Gardner
Bob Garibaldi
Ryan Garko
Jon Garland
Wayne Garland
Mike Garman
Debs Garms
Phil Garner
Ralph Garr
Scott Garrelts
Adrian Garrett
Greg Garrett
Wayne Garrett
Gil Garrido
Cliff Garrison
Ford Garrison
Webster Garrison
Ned Garver
Steve Garvey
Jerry Garvin
Ned Garvin
Matt Garza
Harry Gaspar
Rod Gaspar
Dave Gassner
Tom Gastall
Alex Gaston
Cito Gaston
Milt Gaston
Welcome Gaston
Hank Gastright
Brent Gates
Joe Gates
Aubrey Gatewood
Frank Gatins
Joey Gathright
Chad Gaudin
Sid Gautreaux
Gavern
Mike Gazella
Geoff Geary
Huck Geary
Elmer Gedeon
Joe Gedeon
Rich Gedman
Count Gedney
Johnny Gee
Billy Geer
Josh Geer
Charlie Geggus
Lou Gehrig β
Charlie Gehringer β
Gary Geiger
Dave Geisel
Bill Geiss
Emil Geiss
Vern Geishert
Charlie Gelbert
Joe Genewich
Jim Gentile
Craig Gentry
Gary Gentry
Rufe Gentry
Chris George (LH P)
Chris George (RH P)
Greek George
Craig Gerber
Wally Gerber
Bob Geren
Joe Gerhardt
Al Gerheauser
Steve Gerkin
Esteban Germán
Franklyn Germán
Les German
Justin Germano
Dick Gernert
César Gerónimo
Jody Gerut
Doc Gessler
Al Gettel
Byron Gettis
Jake Gettman
Chris Getz
Gus Getz
Charlie Getzien
Chappie Geygan
Patsy Gharrity
Bob Giallombardo
Jason Giambi
Jeremy Giambi
Joe Giannini
Joe Giard
Tony Giarratano
Joe Gibbon
Jay Gibbons
John Gibbons
Jake Gibbs
Bob Gibson β
Charlie Gibson (1905)
Charlie Gibson (1924)
Frank Gibson
George Gibson
Kirk Gibson
Norwood Gibson
Paul Gibson
Robert Gibson
Russ Gibson
Sam Gibson
George Gick
Brett Gideon
Floyd Giebell
Paul Giel
Dan Giese
Benji Gil
Gerónimo Gil
Gus Gil
Jerry Gil
Andy Gilbert
Billy Gilbert
Charlie Gilbert
Jack Gilbert
John Gilbert
Larry Gilbert
Shawn Gilbert
Tookie Gilbert
Wally Gilbert
Rod Gilbreath
Bill Gilbreth
Don Gile
Brian J. Giles
Brian S. Giles
Marcus Giles
Frank Gilhooley
Bernard Gilkey
Bob Gilks
Pit Gilman
George Gill
Warren Gill
Conor Gillaspie
Carden Gillenwater
Tom Gilles
Bob Gillespie
Jim Gillespie
Paul Gillespie
Patrick Gillespie
Jim Gilliam
Barney Gilligan
Grant Gillis
George Gillpatrick
Len Gilmore
Henry Gilroy
Hal Gilson
Héctor Giménez
Joe Ginsberg
Keith Ginter
Matt Ginter
Al Gionfriddo
Ed Giovanola
Charles Gipson
Joe Girardi
Chris Gissell
Tony Giuliani
Dave Giusti
Dan Gladden
Fred Gladding
Fred Glade
Roland Gladu
Doug Glanville
Jack Glasscock
Troy Glaus
Tommy Glaviano
Mike Glavine
Tom Glavine
Ralph Glaze
Bill Gleason (P)
Bill Gleason (SS)
Harry Gleason
Jack Gleason
Kid Gleason
Roy Gleason
Jerry Don Gleaton
Jim Gleeson
Frank Gleich
Ed Glenn (OF)
Ed Glenn (SS)
Joe Glenn
John Glenn (1870s)
John Glenn (1960s)
George Glinatsis
Ross Gload
Al Glossop
Gary Glover
Bill Glynn
Ed Glynn
Ryan Glynn
Jimmy Gobble
John Gochnaur
Danny Godby
Joe Goddard
Tyrell Godwin
Jerry Goff
Chuck Goggin
Greg Gohr
Jim Golden
Mike Golden
Gordon Goldsberry
Walt Goldsby
Fred Goldsmith
Wally Goldsmith
Izzy Goldstein
Lonnie Goldstein
Purnal Goldy
Mike Goliat
Greg Golson
Dave Goltz
Jonny Gomes
Wayne Gomes
Alexis Gómez
Carlos Gómez
Chile Gómez
Chris Gomez
Lefty Gomez β
Leo Gómez
Luis Gómez
Preston Gómez
Randy Gomez
Ruben Gomez
Jesse Gonder
Joe Gonzales
Larry Gonzales
Rene Gonzales
Adrián González
Alberto González
Alex S. Gonzalez
Álex González
Andy González
Carlos González
Denny González
Édgar Gonzalez (P)
Edgar Gonzalez (2B)
Enrique González
Eusebio González
Fernando González
Geremi González
Germán González
Jose González
Juan González
Julio González
Luis A. González
Luis Gonzalez (OF, 1967)
Luis González (OF, 1995)
Mike Gonzalez (C)
Mike González (P)
Orlando González
Raúl González
Tony González
Wiki González
Johnny Gooch
Andrew Good
Ralph Good
Wilbur Good
Herb Goodall
Dwight Gooden
Billy Goodman
Ival Goodman
Ed Goodson
Art Goodwin
Curtis Goodwin
Danny Goodwin
Marv Goodwin
Pep Goodwin
Tom Goodwin
Ray Goolsby
Glen Gorbous
Ray Gordinier
Alex Gordon
Brian Gordon
Joe Gordon β
Keith Gordon
Sid Gordon
Tom Gordon
George Gore
Reid Gorecki
Rick Gorecki
Charlie Gorin
Bob Gorinski
Herb Gorman
Tom Gorman (1939)
Tom Gorman (1950s)
Tom Gorman (1980s)
Nick Gorneault
Hank Gornicki
Johnny Gorsica
Johnny Goryl
Tom Gorzelanny
Jim Gosger
Goose Goslin β
Mike Gosling
Howie Goss
Rich "Goose" Gossage β
Dick Gossett
Julio Gotay
Rubén Gotay
Jim Gott
Al Gould
Charlie Gould
Nick Goulish
Hank Gowdy
Larry Gowell
Mauro Gozzo
Billy Grabarkewitz
Rod Graber
John Grabow
Jason Grabowski
Johnny Grabowski
Earl Grace
Mark Grace
Mike Grace
Franklyn Gracesqui
John Grady
Mike Grady
Milt Graff
Tony Graffanino
Bernie Graham
Charlie Graham
Jack Graham
Lee Graham
Moonlight Graham
Peaches Graham
Skinny Graham (OF)
Skinny Graham (P)
Wayne Graham
Joe Grahe
Alex Graman
Alex Grammas
Curtis Granderson
Jack Graney
Jeff Granger
Wayne Granger
Eddie Grant
Jim Grant
Jimmy Grant
Mark Grant
Mudcat Grant
George Grantham
Rick Grapenthin
Don Grate
Beiker Graterol
Danny Graves
Dave Gray
Dick Gray
Dolly Gray
Gary Gray
Jeff Gray (1980s)
Jeff Gray (2000s)
Jim Gray
Lorenzo Gray
Pete Gray
Sam Gray
Ted Gray
Eli Grba
John Greason
Craig Grebeck
Andy Green
Dallas Green
Danny Green
David Green
Dick Green
Fred Green
Gary Green
Gene Green
Harvey Green
Lenny Green
Nick Green
Pumpsie Green
Scarborough Green
Sean Green
Shawn Green
Steve Green
Tyler Green
Adam Greenberg
Hank Greenberg β
Al Greene
Charlie Greene
Khalil Greene
Nelson Greene
Paddy Greene
Rick Greene
Todd Greene
Tommy Greene
Tyler Greene
Willie Greene
Kent Greenfield
Jim Greengrass
Mike Greenwell
Bill Greenwood
Bob Greenwood
Brian Greer
Ed Greer
Rusty Greer
Hal Gregg
Kevin Gregg
Tommy Gregg
Vean Gregg
Tom Gregorio
Lee Gregory
Bill Greif
Zack Greinke
Seth Greisinger
Ed Gremminger
Reddy Grey
Bobby Grich
Ben Grieve
Tom Grieve
Ken Griffey Jr.
Ken Griffey Sr.
Alfredo Griffin
Doug Griffin
Ivy Griffin
John-Ford Griffin
Marty Griffin
Mike J. Griffin
Mike L. Griffin
Pug Griffin
Sandy Griffin
Tom Griffin
Bert Griffith
Clark Griffith β
Derrell Griffith
Tommy Griffith
Jeremy Griffiths
Art Griggs
Guido Grilli
Jason Grilli
Steve Grilli
Bob Grim
John Grim
Burleigh Grimes β
Oscar Grimes
Ray Grimes
Roy Grimes
Charlie Grimm
Myron Grimshaw
Jason Grimsley
Ross Grimsley
Dan Griner
Lee Grissom
Marquis Grissom
Marv Grissom
Dick Groat
Heinie Groh
Steve Gromek
Lee Gronkiewicz
Bob Groom
Buddy Groom
Howdy Groskloss
Emil Gross
Gabe Gross
Greg Gross
Kevin Gross
Kip Gross
Turkey Gross
Wayne Gross
Jerry Grote
Johnny Groth
Lefty Grove β
Orval Grove
Charlie Grover
Roy Grover
Johnny Grubb
Henry Gruber
Kelly Gruber
Mark Grudzielanek
Ken Grundt
Kevin Gryboski
Cecilio Guante
Eddie Guardado
Creighton Gubanich
Mark Gubicza
Marv Gudat
Mike Guerra
Mario Guerrero
Pedro Guerrero
Vladimir Guerrero
Wilton Guerrero
Matt Guerrier
Lee Guetterman
Carlos Guevara
Giomar Guevara
Ron Guidry
Aaron Guiel
Carlos Guillén
José Guillén
Ozzie Guillén
Bobby Guindon
Ben Guiney
Skip Guinn
Mike Gulan
Brad Gulden
Don Gullett
Tom Gulley
Bill Gullickson
Ad Gumbert
Billy Gumbert
Harry Gumbert
Randy Gumpert
Eric Gunderson
Hy Gunning
Tom Gunning
Joe Gunson
Larry Gura
Ernie Gust
Frankie Gustine
Bucky Guth
Jeremy Guthrie
Mark Guthrie
César Gutiérrez
Franklin Gutiérrez
Jackie Gutiérrez
Juan Gutiérrez
Ricky Gutiérrez
Don Gutteridge
Ángel Guzmán
Cristian Guzmán
Domingo Guzmán
Freddy Guzmán
Geraldo Guzmán
Joel Guzmán
José Guzmán
Juan Guzman
Doug Gwosdz
Marcus Gwyn
Chris Gwynn
Tony Gwynn β
Tony Gwynn Jr.
Dick Gyselman

References
Last Names starting with G - Baseball-Reference.com

 G